Stephen Patrick Mann (born 20 February 1976 in Belfast, Northern Ireland) is an Irish singer-songwriter and Music Producer, who is known for being the lead singer of rock band Nine Lies. He is second cousin to fellow Irish singer songwriter Damien Rice.

Personal life
Mann was born and grew up on the Falls Road in Belfast. He has described in public the violence of The Troubles, during his childhood and teen years.

Music career
Mann came to prominence with his band Nine Lies, appearing on a string of recordings including "Someone" (2010), "Damn", and their Christmas charity single for the RNLI "Tragedy" in 2012. He had a minor UK radio airplay hit with the self penned 2010 single Someone.

Discography
 Albums
Behind It All (2005)
9 Lies (2015)
Endemic (2020)

 Singles
"Someone" (2010)
"Tragedy" (2012)

References

External links
Nine Lies official site

1976 births
Living people
Musicians from Belfast
21st-century  male singers from Northern Ireland
Alternative rock singers
Male singers from Northern Ireland
Rock singers from Northern Ireland
Singer-songwriters from Northern Ireland